William Holden (22 May 1862 – 3 March 1932) was an American actor. He appeared in more than 16 films from 1920 to 1931.

Selected filmography

References

External links 

1862 births
1932 deaths
American male silent film actors
20th-century American male actors
Male actors from Rochester, New York
American male film actors